Raveendran Nair, known by his stage name Poojappura Ravi is an Indian actor, primarily concentrating on Malayalam films doing comedy roles. He was a stage actor and was a part of Kalanilyam Drama Vision, the famous drama institution. He started doing Malayalam films in the mid-1970s. He has done many " black and white " movies produced in Kerala. Ravi is actually a very flexible character actor who can do almost any role which is evident from his movies. Even though the exact count of the list of his movies is not updated, he has surpassed 600 films. In the 1990s he also did TV serials.

Personal life
Poojappura Ravi was born to Madhavan Pillai and Bhavaniyamma, as eldest of four children, at Poojappura, Thiruvananthapuram, Kerala. He had his primary education at Chinnamma Memorial Girls High School and Thirumala Higher Secondary School. He is married to Thankamma. The couple has a daughter, Lakshmi, and a son, Hari Kumar.....His best character is 1992 – Kallan Kappalil Thanne – Subramaniyam Swami.

Awards
 Ragamalika – JAYAN Award 2012

Filmography

 2016 - Guppy as Chinnappan
 2016 - Darvinte Parinamam as Priest
 2014 - Konthayum Poonoolum 
 2013 – Isaac Newton S/O Philipose
 2013 – Nakhangal as Kuruppu
 2012 – Manjadikkuru as Lawyer 
 2012 - Ardhnari
 2011 – August 15 as Swamy 
 2011 – Nadakame Ulakam
 2010 – Thaskkara Veeran
 2010 – Inganeyum Oral as Majeed
 2009 – Seetha Kalyanam
 2009 – Changathi Koottam
 2006 – Mahasamudram
 2006 – Highway Police as Vanam Vaasu
 2004 – Freedom
 2003 – Kilichundan Mambazham as Chappunni Nair 
 2003 – Sahadoran Sahadevan as Balan Nair
 2002 – Kanalkireedam
 2001 – Achaneyanenikkishttam as Chettiyar 
 2001 – Vezhambal
 2001 – Nariman as Policeman 
 2000 –  Pilots  as Chandy 
 1999 –  Kannezhuthi Pottum Thottu 
 1999 – Stalin Shivadas as Nambiar
 1998 – Harikrishnans as Ramabhadran 
 1997 – Shobhanam
 1997 –  The Car 
 1997 –   Janathipathyam  as Sathya 
 1996 – Dilliwala Rajakumaran as Janardanan 
 1995 –  Vrudhanmare Sookshikkuka  as Swamy 
 1995 –  Kaatttile Thadi Thevarude Ana 
 1995 –  Agni Devan  as Payippadan 
 1995 –  Hijack  as Parthan
 1994 – Pavam IA Ivachan
 1994 –  Pidakkozhi Koovunna Noottandu  as Amby 
 1993 – Aayirappara as Kurup 
 1993 – Customs Diary
 1992 – Kizhakkan Pathrose
 1992 –  Adharam  as Sankaran Nair 
 1992 - Sabarimalayil Thanka Sooryodayam as Rajappan
 1992 –  Kallan Kappail Thanne  as Subramaniyam Swami 
 1991 – Chanchattam as Bus Driver 
 1991 –   Kilukkam 
 1991 - Raid as Nagan Pilla
 1991 -  Nattuvishesham as Forest Guard
 1991 –  Nettippattam  as Jambo Jamal
 1990 – Maan Mizhiyal
 1990 – Kadathanadan Ambadi
 1990 –  Gulabi Raaten
 1990 – Superstar as Shenoy 
 1989 – Malayathi Pennu
 1989 - Annakutty Kodambakkam Vilikkunnu
 1989 – Kali karyamaai: Crime Branch as Shankara Pilla
 1989 – Ayiram Chirakulla Moham as Anandanarayana Iyyer
 1988 – Witness
 1988 – Charavalayam as Kuttan Pilla
 1988 –  Oru CBI Diary Kurippu  as Mathai
 1987 – Ellavarkkum Nanmakal
 1986 – Niramulla Raavukal as Peter
 1986 – Ninnishttam Ennishttam
 1986 – Nandi Veendum Varika as Mathachan 
 1986 –  Mazha Peyyunnu Maddalam Kottunnu as Doctor  
 1986 – Rakkuyilin Rakasadasil
 1986 – Ayalvasi Oru Daridravasi as Minnal Paramasivam 
 1985 – Snehicha Kuttathinu
 1985 – Ithu Nalla Thamasha as Vaidyar 
 1985 – Akkare Ninnoru Maran'' as Kanaran 
 1985 –  Pathamudayam  – Kuttan Pillai
 1985 –  Mutharamkunnu P.O.  as Phalgunan  
 1985 –  Kaiyum Thalayum Purathidaruthu  – Police Constable 
 1985 – Mukya Manthri 1985 – Kiratham as Kuttan Pilla
 1985 – Pachavelicham 1985 – Anakkorumma as Narayana Pilla
 1985 – Oru Naal Innoru Naal 1984 – Odaruthammava Aalariyam 1984 – Poochakkoru Mookkuthi as Supran 
 1984 – Vanitha Police 
 1984 – Nishedi as Narayana Pilla
 1984 – Itha Innu Muthal as Ravi 
 1984 - Kudumbam Oru Swargam Bharya Oru Devatha.... John
 1984 – Muthodu Muthu as Govindan 
 1983 – Eettappuli 1983 – Engane Nee Marakkum 1983 – Coolie as Moneylender 
 1983 – Kuyiline Thedi 1983 – Swapname Ninakku Nandi as Pachu Pilla
 1983 - Thimingalam as Chacko
 1982 – Kazhumaram 1982 - Enikkum Oru Divasam as Thankappan
 1982 – Drohi 1982 – Chilanthivala 1981 – Swapnaragam 1981 – Ellam Ninakku Vendi as Venu
 1981 – Kattukallan 1981 – Thenum Vayambum  
 1981 – Ariyapedatha Rahasyam as Paramu 
 1980 – Nayattu 1980 – Idimuzhakkam as Kochu Panikkar
 1980 – Ambalavilakku as Radhakrishnan
 1980 – Theenalangal as Kunjappan
 1980 – Sakthi as Man at the Toddy Shop 
 1979 – Venalil Oru Mazha as Shop Keeper 
 1979 – Puthiya Velicham as Kesavan Nair 
 1979 – Pambaram 1979 – Shudhikalasham as Subramanya Iyyer
 1979 – Mamankam as Samoothiri's Warrior 
 1979 – Prabatha Sandhya 1979 – Sayoojyam as Khader
 1979 – Jeevitham Oru Ganam as Kuttan Pillai 
 1978 – Puthariyankam 1978 – Rowdy Ramu as Mani Swami
 1978 – Ithaa Oru Manushyan as Kuttan Pilla
 1978 – Prarthana 1978 – Padmatheertham as Prabhakaran
 1978 - Karimpuli 1978 – Pavadakkari 1978 – Thacholi Ambu 1977 – Sangamam 1977 – Sujatha as Thirumeni
 1977 – Ormakal Marikkumo as Vaidyar
 1977 – Ivanente Priyaputhran 1977 – Aval Oru Devaalayam 1976 – Ammini Ammaavan'' as Swami

Television
Mandrake (Asianet)
Kadamattathu Kathanar (Asianet)
Dream city (Surya TV)
Kadamattathachan (Surya TV)
Bhaamini Tholkarila(Asianet)
Swami Ayyappan (TV series) (Asianet)
Mahathma Gandhi Colony (Surya TV)
Melappadam (Doordarshan)
Aluvayum Mathikariyum (Asianet Plus)

References
1978- Itha oru manushyan, 1979- jeevitham oru ganam, 1985-Keerthanam, 1985-pathamudhayam, 1988-charavalayam .these movies his character names Kuttan Pillai. 
Remarkable Kuttan Pillai police character

External links
 
 Poojappura Ravi at MSI

Living people
Male actors from Thiruvananthapuram
Male actors in Malayalam cinema
Indian male film actors
20th-century Indian male actors
21st-century Indian male actors
Indian male television actors
Male actors in Malayalam television
1947 births